Abdülkerim Durmaz (born 13 September 1960) is a Turkish former international association football player and football manager and, current pundit and TV Personality. He represented Turkey at senior level in 11 international encounters.

Honours
Fenerbahçe
 Super League (1): 1984–85
 Turkish Super Cup (1): 1984–85
 TSYD Cup (2): 1985–86, 1986–87
 Fleet Cup (1): 1984–85

Filmography and television

Film

Television

References
Citations

External links
 Abdülkerim Durmaz at TFF

1960 births
Living people
Turkish Muslims
Turkish footballers
Turkey under-21 international footballers
Turkey international footballers
Association football defenders
Footballers from Istanbul
Süper Lig players
Fatih Karagümrük S.K. footballers
Fenerbahçe S.K. footballers
MKE Ankaragücü footballers
Sakaryaspor footballers
Zeytinburnuspor footballers
Turkish football managers
Fatih Karagümrük S.K. managers
Eyüpspor managers
Kasımpaşa S.K. managers

Mersin İdman Yurdu managers
Adana Demirspor managers